The Bangkok Daily Mail was an English-language daily newspaper in Thailand first published at the beginning of January 1910. Its former name was Siam Free Press.  The newspaper was owned by King Prajadhipok (Rama VII) and run by Prince Svasti and Louis Girivat. Its office was located on Si Phraya Road. On 8 August 1933, The Bangkok Daily Mail was suspended by the authorities and was allowed to resume publication following an apology and the payment of a deposit 'for future good behavior'. However, it was closed once and for all by the Government in October 1933 "because of its royalist connections".

A special weekly pictorial and feature section was included with Saturday issues.

The newspaper also had a version published in Thai (กรุงเทพฯเดลิเมล์).

See also 
Timeline of English-language newspapers published in Thailand
List of online newspaper archives - Thailand

References

Further reading 
 

Defunct newspapers published in Thailand
English-language newspapers published in Asia
English-language newspapers published in Thailand
Mass media in Bangkok